Sangpyeong station is a closed train station in Okgu Line, North Jeolla, South Korea.

Timeline 
: Station opened as an unstaffed simplified station
: Class changed to a staffed simplified station
: Class changed to an unstaffed simplified station
: Station services suspended

References 

Okgu Line
Railway stations opened in 1955
Railway stations in North Jeolla Province
1955 establishments in South Korea